Quesnel station in Quesnel, British Columbia, Canada is a railway station which is used by the Rocky Mountaineer train service.  The station is used on the Rainforest to Gold Rush route that links Whistler to  Quesnel.  Service is infrequent and only occurs several days per month.

The station was originally established for the Pacific Great Eastern Railway, later called BC Rail and the midpoint for the day-liner service from North Vancouver, until that service ended on October 31, 2002.

The two-storey station building was constructed in 1921 as a "Standard No.3" design with a rectangular shape and gable roof.

References

Rocky Mountaineer stations in British Columbia
Railway stations in Canada opened in 1921